Victor Anthony Darensbourg (born November 13, 1970) is a former professional baseball pitcher.
Vic played his high school baseball at Westchester High in Los Angeles, CA.

Major league career
Darensbourg has an 8–17 career record during eight seasons as a major league pitcher with the Florida Marlins, Colorado Rockies, Montreal Expos, Chicago White Sox, New York Mets, and Detroit Tigers.

On December 18, 2007, two years after his last MLB game, Darensbourg signed with the Philadelphia Phillies organization and played for their Triple-A affiliate, the Lehigh Valley IronPigs, before being released on May 2, 2008.

Atlantic League
On June 11, 2008, Darensbourg signed with the Long Island Ducks of the Atlantic League.
Victor has 3 daughters, Paige, Sydney, and Lauren, who live in Las Vegas, Nevada.

External links
, or Retrosheet

1970 births
Living people
American expatriate baseball players in Canada
Baseball players from Los Angeles
Brevard County Manatees players
Buffalo Bisons (minor league) players
Calgary Cannons players
Charlotte Knights players
Chicago White Sox players
Colorado Rockies players
Colorado Springs Sky Sox players
Detroit Tigers players
Edmonton Trappers players
Florida Marlins players
Gulf Coast Marlins players
High Desert Mavericks players
Kane County Cougars players
Lehigh Valley IronPigs players
Lewis–Clark State Warriors baseball players
Long Island Ducks players
Major League Baseball pitchers
Montreal Expos players
Naranjeros de Hermosillo players
American expatriate baseball players in Mexico
Navegantes del Magallanes players
American expatriate baseball players in Venezuela
New York Mets players
Norfolk Tides players
Portland Sea Dogs players
Santa Monica College alumni
Santa Monica Corsairs baseball players
St. George Roadrunners players
Toledo Mud Hens players
Yaquis de Obregón players
Westchester High School (Los Angeles) alumni